The Laird O Logie or The Laird Of Logie is Child ballad number 182.

Synopsis
Young Logie (or Ochiltrie) is imprisoned, to hang.  May Margaret comes to court to plead for his life.  She is unable to win a pardon but steals some token or a forged pardon (and sometimes a weapon), sometimes with the queen's aid.  With these, she frees Young Logie—the man she loves, or the father of her baby, depending on the variant.

Commentary
The ballad is based on historical events in Scotland in 1592.  The king is James VI of Scotland and Young Logie is John Wemyss, the Laird of Logie in North Fife.  The offense for which he was imprisoned, unlike the stolen kiss claimed in some variants, was involvement with the Francis Stewart, 5th Earl of Bothwell in an attempt to kidnap the king. Margaret Vinstarr was one of the servants of Anne of Denmark, a Danish maid of honour, and succeeded in rescuing Logie from a prison in Dalkeith Palace. They later married.

See also
 Geordie

External links
 Many variants

References
 "Scots Songs and Ballads from Perthshire Tradition" 

Child Ballads
James VI and I
Scottish folk songs
Logie
Fife
Year of song unknown